John II or III of Cyprus (16 May 1418 – 28 July 1458) was the King of Cyprus and Armenia and also titular King of Jerusalem from 1432 to 1458. He was previously a titular Prince of Antioch.

History
Born 16 May 1418 in Nicosia, John was the son of king Janus of Cyprus and Charlotte of Bourbon. In May, sometime between 1435 and 1440, he married Amadea Palaiologina of Monferrato, daughter of John Jacob Palaiologos, Marquess of Montferrat. They had no children. His second wife, a distant relative of his first, was Helena Palaiologina, only child and daughter of Theodore II Palaiologos, Despot of the Morea, and his wife Cleofa Malatesta 

By his second marriage he had:
 Charlotte, Queen of Cyprus, married Prince John of Antioch
 Cleopha of Lusignan, died young

John died in Nicosia on 28 July 1458 and his daughter Charlotte succeeded to the throne. During his rule, Corycus, the only Cypriot stronghold in mainland Anatolia, was lost to the Karamanids in 1448.

John had an illegitimate son by Marietta de Patras
 James II, King of Cyprus
John appointed James, Archbishop of Nicosia at the age of 16. James did not prove ideal archbishop material, and was stripped of his title after murdering the royal chamberlain. His father eventually forgave him and restored him to the Archbishopric. James and Helena were enemies, vying for influence over John. After Helena died in 1458, it appeared that John would appoint James as his successor, but John died before he could make it so.

References

Sources

|-

Kings of Cyprus
Kings of the Armenian Kingdom of Cilicia
1418 births
1458 deaths
15th-century Cypriot people
Claimant Kings of Jerusalem
House of Poitiers-Lusignan